Giovanni Cappiello (born 26 March 1997) is an Italian football player. He plays for Serie D club Agropoli.

Club career
He made his Serie C debut for Salernitana on 16 May 2015 in a game against Novara.

On 23 July 2019, he joined Serie D club Nola.

References

External links
 
 

1997 births
People from Salerno
Living people
Italian footballers
U.S. Salernitana 1919 players
S.S. Monopoli 1966 players
S.S. Fidelis Andria 1928 players
Paganese Calcio 1926 players
U.S. Agropoli 1921 players
Serie C players
Serie D players
Association football forwards
Footballers from Campania
Sportspeople from the Province of Salerno
21st-century Italian people